The following highways are numbered 906:

Costa Rica
 National Route 906

United States